Emilio Márquez is an American drummer who currently plays in Asesino, Engrave, Coffin Texts, and Possessed.  He was also the former drummer for Brainstorm (Los Angeles) and Sadistic Intent (1996–2010).

Márquez, along with fellow Asesino members Dino Cazares and Tony Campos, voiced characters in the Adult Swim series Metalocalypse.

References 

1974 births
American heavy metal drummers
American musicians of Mexican descent
Living people
People from Los Angeles
Possessed (band) members
Asesino members
20th-century American drummers
American male drummers
Brujeria (band) members
21st-century American drummers
20th-century American male musicians
21st-century American male musicians